Crown gold is a 22 karat (kt) gold alloy used in the crown coin introduced in England in 1526 (by Henry VIII). In this alloy, the proportion of gold is 22 parts out of 24 (91.667% gold)—and is appreciably less prone to wear than the softer 23 kt gold of earlier gold sovereigns—an important point for coins intended for everyday use in circulation.

Alloying metal
The alloying metal in England was, and is, traditionally restricted to copper. This is still used for the current British gold sovereign. An exception was for the gold sovereigns of 1887, when 1.25% silver, replacing the same weight of copper, was used to gain a better reproduction image of Queen Victoria for the Golden Jubilee of her reign.

Elsewhere, both copper and silver have been used in varying proportions.

Circulating coins
In the United States until 1834, gold circulating coins were minted in 22 kt. crown gold—although using about 6% silver as well as copper. From 1834, the fineness of U.S. coin gold was decreased from the 22 kt "crown gold" standard to 0.8992 fine (21.58 kt); and in 1837 to 0.900 fine (21.60 kt exactly). This 90% gold–copper alloy continued in the U.S. from 1837 until gold coins were removed from circulation in the U.S. in 1933.

The South African Krugerrand, first produced in 1967, is produced in the traditional crown gold recipe of 22 kt gold, (remainder copper), because it was originally intended to circulate as currency.

Bullion coins
Most gold coinage nowadays is not designed for daily use and circulation, so the requirement for a hard alloy is much less—and such bullion coins are commonly of pure gold of 24 kt, 0.999, 0.9999, or even 0.99999 fine (see Canadian Gold Maple Leaf). 

Regardless, some bullion coins have stayed with the traditional crown gold standard, including the British sovereign, the Krugerrand, and American Gold Eagles.

See also
The Great Debasement

References

External links
 Metal Used in Coins and Medals by Tony Clayton

Gold
Coins
Precious metal alloys
Numismatics
History of British coinage